This is the discography of American hip hop recording artist Jamal "Mac Mall" Rocker from Vallejo, California.

Studio albums

Solo albums

Collaboration albums

Compilation albums

Soundtrack albums

Mixtapes

Singles

References

External links

 Mac Mall discography at AllMusic
 Mac Mall discography at Discogs

Hip hop discographies
Discographies of American artists